The Pit-Prop Syndicate is a 1922 thriller novel by Freeman Wills Crofts, one of the leading figures of the Golden Age of Detective Fiction. It was one of several stand-alone novels Crofts wrote following his successful debut The Cask, before creating the character of Inspector French who debuted  in Inspector French's Greatest Case (1924).

Synopsis
A boat notionally carrying pit props from the Gironde to the Humber is in fact engaging in illegal smuggling. This leads on to a murder in a London taxi and an investigation by the slow but sure Inspector Willis of Scotland Yard.

References

Bibliography
 Evans, Curtis. Masters of the "Humdrum" Mystery: Cecil John Charles Street, Freeman Wills Crofts, Alfred Walter Stewart and the British Detective Novel, 1920-1961. McFarland, 2014.
 Reilly, John M. Twentieth Century Crime & Mystery Writers. Springer, 2015.

1922 British novels
Novels by Freeman Wills Crofts
British thriller novels
Detective novels
William Collins, Sons books
Novels set in France
Novels set in England
Novels set in London